Aldington may refer to:

 Aldington, Kent, a village SE of Ashford, England
 Aldington, Worcestershire, a village east of Evesham, England

People with the surname
 Richard Aldington (1892–1962), English writer and poet
 Toby Low, 1st Baron Aldington (1914–2000), British soldier, politician and businessman
 Charles Low, 2nd Baron Aldington (born 1948), British banker

See also
Adlington (disambiguation)